Prototype is an American progressive metal band from Los Angeles. The band was formed in 1994 by vocalist/guitarist Vince Levalois and guitarist Kragen Lum, who were both members of Psychosis at the time. The band's current line-up comprises founding members Levalois and Lum, bassist Kirk Scherer and drummer Pat Magrath. Bassists Stephen Gambina and Mike Bear and drummers Damion Ramirez and Nic Ritter are former members of the band.

Prototype has released three studio albums, one live album, two extended plays, three demos (with two others unreleased) and one compilation album, and collaborated on numerous other projects. Several of the band's songs are also featured in video games.

History

Early years, Trinity and Continuum (1994–2007)
In January 1994, Psychosis guitarists Vince Levalois and Kragen Lum shifted their focus to forming their own band, recruiting bassist Stephen Gambina and drummer Damion Ramirez, and named the band Prototype. The new band then began recording their debut release, a demo titled Seed, and released it later that year. The demo went on to receive praise and was referred to as the benchmark for modern aggressive/melodic progressive metal. The demo contained three songs: "Seed", "Shine", and "Dead of Jericho"; all three tracks later appeared on the band's first two studio albums. In 1996, Gambina and Ramirez left the band, and were replaced by bassist Mike Bear and drummer Pat Magrath. Gambina, however, remained with the band as a writer to help contribute material for their following release, and continued to do so thereafter. In 1997, the band began recording an EP, titled Cloned, and released it in 1998. The following year, bassist Kirk Scherer replaced Bear in the band, completing the line-up that has lasted nearly a decade.

The band began working on their first studio album, Trinity, in mid-2000, and the album was released on February 12, 2002. The band later appeared on Phantom Lords: A Tribute to Metallica, covering Metallica's song "Battery". Later that year, Magrath left Prototype, and the band decided to re-enlist their former drummer Damion Ramirez. In 2004, an instrumental version of the song "Probe" was featured in MTX Mototrax. In the same year, five songs from Trinity, including "Pure", "Trinity" and "Shine", were featured in True Crime: Streets of LA. After three years of touring and playing in shows throughout the United States, the band returned to the studio early 2005 to record their second studio album, Continuum, which was released on May 23, 2006. Ramirez recorded majority of the drum tracks for the album, while Magrath returned to play on the song "Heart Machine". In 2006, the song "Synthespian" appeared in Tony Hawk's Downhill Jam, and in 2007, the song "The Way It Ends" featured as a bonus playable song in Guitar Hero III: Legends of Rock; the same song later appeared as a Rock Band Network downloadable content (DLC) song for Rock Band 3 in 2012, one year before the network's designer, Harmonix, announced that they would be discontinuing regular DLC updates for the Rock Band series. In 2007, Levalois, Lum and Scherer were endorsed by Jackson Guitars and appeared in the product catalogues; Lum's custom seven-string Soloist was featured in the catalogue's custom shop guitars. Later that year, Lum also joined thrash metal band Heathen.

Catalyst and other projects (2008–present)
In early 2008, Ramirez left Prototype for the second time and was replaced by drummer Nic Ritter, who had been performing with thrash metal band Warbringer at the time. However, due to Ritter's commitments with Warbringer, the band re-enlisted Pat Magrath in 2009, and began working on their third studio album later that year. Catalyst was released on September 11, 2012, and saw a change in the sound of the band's music to a more thrash metal-inspired sound. In November 2012, the band released the compilation album Retrospect, which featured music from all five of the band's demos, including Seed. On March 4, 2013, the band released their second EP, The Way It Ends - Video Game EP, which featured exclusive mixes of the band's songs that have previously been featured in video games.

To celebrate the band's 20th anniversary, on March 4, 2014, Prototype released the live album Live At The Whisky 1998 online. The live album is a recording of the band's performance at Whisky a Go Go in Hollywood on December 5, 1998, where it was supporting death metal band Death. In late 2014, Lum recorded himself playing guitar solos from several of the band's songs and posted the videos on Prototype's official YouTube channel. Levalois later collaborated with former Control Denied vocalist Tim Aymar, former Watchtower vocalist Jason McMaster and Holy Grail vocalist James Paul Luna on the Control/Resist EP, Gods By Design, which was released on February 22, 2015.

Musical style and influences
In the band's early years, Prototype was known for its progressive metal sound, and nearly all of the songs from the band's first two studio albums, Trinity and Continuum, were in D tuning on standard six-string guitars. However, on the band's third album, Catalyst, the band expanded from their earlier progressive metal sound to a more thrash metal-inspired sound, with aggressive guitar riffs, deeper vocals, complex bass lines and fastest drum patterns and blast beats. All of the songs from the album were in B tuning on seven-string guitars. The band is also notable for performing songs at live shows exactly as they are heard on the band's releases. All of the band's lyrics focused on life, destiny and inner struggles, and their artwork and album cover designs are science fiction-themed and designed by graphic designer Travis Smith.

Prototype's influences include Metallica, Rush, Cynic and Dream Theater.

Band members

Current members
 Vince Levalois – guitars, lead vocals (1994–present)
 Kragen Lum – guitars, backing vocals (1994–present)
 Kirk Scherer – bass, backing vocals (1999–present)
 Pat Magrath – drums (1996–2002, 2009–present)

Former members
 Stephen Gambina – bass (1994–1996)
 Mike Bear – bass (1996–1999)
 Damion Ramirez – drums (1994–1996, 2002–2008)
 Nic Ritter – drums (2008–2009; died 2017)

Timeline

Discography
 Trinity (2002)
 Continuum (2006)
 Catalyst (2012)

External links
 
 
 

1994 establishments in California
American progressive metal musical groups
Thrash metal musical groups from California
Musical groups from Los Angeles
Musical groups established in 1994
Musical quartets